The Rohilla dynasty was a dynasty that ruled over much of North-West Uttar Pradesh in the form of Rohilkhand and later until 1947, the Princely State of Rampur. At the height of their power the dynasty ruled over the Kingdom of Rohilkhand and held suzairnty over the Kingdom of Kumaon and Kingdom of Garhwhal. 

The Nawabs of Rampur eliminated communal violence during their reign, even when there was wide spread ethnic cleansing of Muslim subjects in the states of Sikh States, Alwar and Bharatpur during the Partition Riots, widely believed to have been ordered by their rulers. The Nawab on the other hand, strictly forbade his nobles from committing reprisal attacks against non-Muslims.

Origin
Rohillas are Afghans who migrated to north India during the 17th and 18th centuries. However, the Rohilla dynasty descended from the founder of the Kingdom of Rohilkhand, Nawab Ali Muhammed Khan, who was a Jat boy of age of eight when he was adopted by the chief of the Barech tribe, Sardar Daud Khan Rohilla. He became the Rohilla chief after the death of his foster father, Daud Khan. Due to the role he played in the establishment of Rohilkhand and in the general history of Rohillas, he gained recognition as a Rohilla chief, although he was not Afghan by birth.

History 

The dynasty rose to prominence with the first nawab of Rohilkhand, Nawab Ali Mohammad Khan.

Formation 
Ali Mohammed Khan attracted many Afghan adventurers by virtue of his great reputation and became the most powerful man in Katehir. Conscious of his own power and the failing state of the Mughal Empire, he neglected imperial mandates and irregularly paid tax to the central government. Using the income from his lands to raise troops, purchase artillery and military stores and curry favour with political persons of interest, he used the same tactic to gain favour with the lower rungs of society. By his invasion of Nadir Shah in 1739 he strengthened his position, with many Afghans joining him. By 1740 he was officially recognised by the Emperor Muhammad Shah as governor. For the subsequent five years, his authority was unchallenged.

In 1745 a quarrel arose between Ali Mohammed and Safdar Jang, the subedar of Oudh. Ali's retainers seized the property of servants belonging to Safdar. Safdar was already jealous at Ali's growing power. He went to Emperor Muhammad Shah, and through him ordered the return of the confiscated property as well as the arrest of the Rohillas in charge of the confiscation. After Ali's refusal, Safdar led an imperial expedition together with the emperor. Ali's men deserted and he was captured and taken to Delhi.

He was treated respectfully by the emperor, in large part due to his influence among his many adherents. Ali was propitiated by an appointment as Governor of Sirhind (the area between Jummuna and Sutlej).

In 1748 an invasion by Ahmed Shah Abidali allowed Ali the opportunity to return to Katehir and re-establish his rule. Upon his return, he was rejoined by most of his men and became virtually independent in his control of Rohilkhand. To ensure loyalty almost all positions of power were given to Afghan and several including Najib-ad-daula received land grants.

Second generation 
On his deathbed, Ali Mohammad anointed his foster uncle Rehmat Khan as "Hafiz" (protector) of Rohilkhand and Dundi Khan as Chief of Army. He had already planned the division of his realm among his sons and received Rehmat Khan and Dundi Khan's solemn oaths that they would execute his will and protect the interests of his children. A council was created of the Rohilla chiefs in part to keep a check on Rehmat Khan and Dundi Khan and to provide a government that would safeguard Rohilkhand from invasion. All carried out solemn promises to carry out their duty, but they all reneged and sought to establish their own autonomy. This led to a confederation-like structure of government with the nawab of Rohilkhand at its head and the Rohilla chiefs in charge of individual Rohilla states answering to him, especially in regards to military engagements.

Ali's realm was divided in such a way so as to create discord. Nawab Abdullah Khan and Nawab Murtaza Khan were given shared rule over Badaun. Nawab Alah Yar Khan and Nawab Saadullah Khan were given shared rule over Moradabad, Nawab Faizullah Khan was given rule over Rampur and Nawab Muhammad Yar Khan was given rule over Barielly. In 1754 Hafiz Rehmat Khan orchestrated an argument within the royal family and used it as a pretext to usurp the power and wealth of the orphans. Disgusted, Muhammad Yar Khan along with his older brother Abdullah Khan and younger brother Allah Yar Khan left for Oojanee. Nawab Alah Yar Khan died of consumption, and Nawab Murtaza Khan left for Secunderabad, where he died. Nawab Saadullah Khan was appointed nawab of Rohilkhand. Later, Nawab Abdullah Khan and Nawab Muhammad Yar Khan were granted land again. Nawab Muhammad Yar Khan was given rule over Aonla, and his court at Tandah was famed for poets such as Qaim and Mushafi.

Relations with the British 
The dynasty was highly regarded by the British for their "determined bravery". The Rohilla Wars were the most costly for the British against any Indian kingdom. The ensuing guerrilla war forced the British to grant the Rohillas a princely state wheresoever they willed, leading to the creation of Rampur. Their bravery, tolerance and progressive rule gained them admiration. They were called upon by the British for aid in the Anglo-French Wars. Burke described the Rohillas as "the bravest, the most honourable and generous" and the nawab of Rampur became the first Indian sovereign to meet Queen Victoria along with several other European monarchs.

Dynastic relations 
It is probably a branch of the influential Barha dynasty best known as de facto ruling Mughal empire during the early 18th century. In the 19th century, descendants of Ali Mohammed Khan, specifically the Nawabs of Rampur, made disputed claims that he was a Barha Sayyid and began the usage the title of Sayyid. However, they could not present any pedigree or valid historical proof in the support of this claim. The Nawabs even sought service of a prominent religious leader of Rampur, Najmul Ghani for establishing ancestry from Ali, which was widely rejected.

List of Rulers

Kingdom of Rohilkhand

Rampur State

References

Dynasties of India
Rohilla
Rohilkhand
Pashtun dynasties
Rampur, Uttar Pradesh
Muslim dynasties of India
Islamic rule in the Indian subcontinent